Harjumaa, (1200 hides), was an ancient county in what would now be Estonia.

Parishes 

around Varbola
around Lohu
around Kose

See also 

Danish Estonia
Harju County
Rapla County
History of Estonia
Livonian Crusade
Rulers of Estonia
St. George's Night Uprising
Varbola Stronghold

References

Ancient counties of Estonia
Harju County